"Kingdom" is a song performed by American contemporary worship collective Maverick City Music and American gospel musician Kirk Franklin, which features vocals from Naomi Raine and Chandler Moore. The song was released on May 20, 2022, as a promotional single from their collaborative live album, Kingdom Book One (2022). The song was written by Chandler Moore, Jacob Poole, Jonathan Jay, and Kirk Franklin.

"Kingdom" debuted at number 17 on the US Hot Christian Songs chart, and at number six on the Hot Gospel Songs chart. The song received the Grammy Award for Best Gospel Performance/Song at the 2023 Grammy Awards.

Background
On May 13, 2022, MultiTracks revealed that Maverick City Music and Kirk Franklin have released the resources of the song "Kingdom" from their upcoming collaborative album a week early ahead of the song's release. "Kingdom" was subsequently released on May 20, 2022, accompanied with its music video.

Composition

Awards and nominations

Commercial performance
"Kingdom" debuted at number 19 on the US Hot Christian Songs chart, and number seven on the Hot Gospel Songs chart dated June 4, 2022.

Music video
On May 20, 2022, Tribl Records released the official music video of "Kingdom" by Maverick City Music and Kirk Franklin, featuring Naomi Raine and Chandler Moore, via YouTube. The video shows Kirk Franklin, Naomi Raine and Chandler Moore performing the song alongside inmates at the Everglades Correctional Institution in Miami-Dade, Florida.

Performances
On June 20, 2022, Maverick City Music and Kirk Franklin performed "Kingdom" on The View in commemoration of Juneteenth. The performance, which featured Naomi Raine, Chandler Moore, and Brandon Lake, was aired on ABC. On June 23, 2022, Maverick City Music and Kirk Franklin performed "Kingdom" on their Tiny Desk Concert performance as part of NPR Music's commemoration of Black Music Month. On June 26, 2022, Maverick City Music and Kirk Franklin did a live televised performance of "Kingdom" and "Melodies from Heaven" at the 2022 BET Awards. On July 6, 2022, Maverick City Music and Kirk Franklin performed "Kingdom" on NBC's Today Show. On July 15, 2022, Maverick City Music and Kirk Franklin performed "Kingdom" on Fox & Friends as part of the All-American Summer Concert Series at Fox Square.

Charts

Weekly charts

Year-end charts

Release history

References

External links
 

2022 songs
Maverick City Music songs
Kirk Franklin songs
Chandler Moore songs
Songs written by Kirk Franklin
Songs written by Chandler Moore